The 2015–16 North Carolina Tar Heels men's basketball team represented the University of North Carolina at Chapel Hill during the 2015–16 NCAA Division I men's basketball season. The team's head coach was Roy Williams, who was in his 13th season as UNC's men's basketball head coach. The Tar Heels played their home games at the Dean Smith Center and were members of the Atlantic Coast Conference. North Carolina finished the season with a 33–7 record, 14–4 to win the ACC regular season championship. The Tar Heels defeated Virginia to win the ACC tournament. They received an automatic bid to the NCAA tournament as a #1 seed. There, they defeated Florida Gulf Coast, Providence, Indiana, and Notre Dame to earn a trip to the Final Four, the school's 19th trip to the Final Four. In a matchup against fellow ACC foe, Syracuse, the Tar Heels won easily to advance to the National Championship against Villanova. North Carolina, despite a circus shot by Marcus Paige to tie the game at 74 with less than five seconds remaining, lost on a last second three pointer by Kris Jenkins.

Previous season
The Tar Heels finished the 2014–15 season 26–12, 11–7 in ACC play to finish in fifth place. They advanced to the championship game of the ACC tournament where they lost to Notre Dame. They received an at-large bid to the NCAA tournament where they defeated Harvard and Arkansas before losing in the Sweet Sixteen to eventual National Runner-Up Wisconsin.

Departures

Class of 2015 signees

Roster

Schedule and results

|-
!colspan=12 style="background:#56A0D3; color:#FFFFFF;"| Exhibition

|-
!colspan=12 style="background:#56A0D3; color:#FFFFFF;"| Non-conference regular season

|-
!colspan=12 style="background:#56A0D3; color:#FFFFFF;"| ACC Regular Season

|-
!colspan=12 style="background:#56A0D3; color:#FFFFFF;"| ACC Tournament

|-
!colspan=12 style="background:#56A0D3; color:#FFFFFF;"| NCAA tournament

Rankings

Players drafted into the NBA

References

North Carolina
North Carolina Tar Heels men's basketball seasons
North Carolina
NCAA Division I men's basketball tournament Final Four seasons
Tar
Tar